Marian Cannon Schlesinger (September 13, 1912 – October 14, 2017) was an American artist and author.

She published two volumes of her memoir, Snatched from Oblivion: A Cambridge Memoir and I Remember: A Life of Politics, Painting and People, as well as five children's books, which she also illustrated.
She painted landscapes and portraits and spent time in China to study art.

Personal life
She was a native of Cambridge, Massachusetts, and a graduate of Radcliffe College. Her mother was feminist reformer and novelist Cornelia James Cannon, and her father was Walter Bradford Cannon, a professor at Harvard University. She was married for thirty years to Arthur M. Schlesinger Jr.; their daughter, Christina Schlesinger, is a painter.

Works
 San Bao and his Adventures in Peking, 1939; 2d. edition Cambridge MA: Gale Hill Books, 1998. 
 Children of the Fiery Mountain, New York: E.P. Dutton and Company, 1940.
 Snatched From Oblivion: A Cambridge Memoir, Boston: Little Brown and Company, 1979.
 I Remember: A Life of Politics, Painting and People, Cambridge MA: TidePool Press, 2012.

References

External links

 "Marian Cannon Schlesinger Remembers", radcliffe.harvard.edu; accessed December 9, 2016.
 New York Times obituary, October 10, 2017.

1912 births
2017 deaths
20th-century American painters
20th-century American women artists
American centenarians
American children's writers
American landscape painters
American memoirists
American portrait painters
American women children's writers
American women illustrators
American illustrators
American women painters
Artists from Connecticut
Radcliffe College alumni
American women memoirists
Writers from Connecticut
Women centenarians
21st-century American women